Neptali Alvaro Gonzales (June 10, 1923 – September 16, 2001), better known as Neptali Gonzales, Sr., was the President of the Philippine Senate from 1992 to 1993, 1995 to 1996, and 1998.

Early life and career
Neptali Alvaro Gonzales was born in 1923. He graduated class valedictorian in the Philippine Law School. He placed 9th in the 1949 bar examinations with the grade of 92.50%.

He practiced law for 31 years, and was a professor and reviewer in leading law schools. He wrote five law books used by law students and practitioners. He was Dean of the Far Eastern University Institute of Law from 1976 to 1986.

He was elected Vice Governor of the Province of Rizal from 1967 to 1969, Congressman of the First District of Rizal from 1969 to 1973 and the Congressional District of the Philippines with three cities and ten municipalities, Assemblyman for the District of Mandaluyong-San Juan (1984–1986) and Senator for two consecutive terms (1987–1998). Before his election as Senator, he was appointed Minister, later Secretary of Justice (1986–1987) by then President Corazon C. Aquino.

During Martial Law, he was the one of its active critics from the opposition and lawyered for some political detainees including then Senator Ninoy Aquino.

He had a distinguished career in law as professor, and dean of the Institute of Law at the Far Eastern University and bar reviewer in different schools.

Senate Presidency

First term (1992-1993)
He first served as Senate President, from January 18, 1992, to January 18, 1993. He also served as the Minority Leader of the Senate's Progressive Coalition from October 10, 1996, to January 26, 1998.

Senator Gonzales was the permanent delegate of the Congress of the Philippines to the century-old Inter-Parliamentary Union and the ASEAN Inter-Parliamentary Assembly. He was also a delegate to the International Labor Organization.

Second term (1995-1996)
He again served as Senate President from August 29, 1995, to October 10, 1996.

For his outstanding achievements and contributions in the fields of law, education, and public service, he was conferred the degrees of Doctor of Laws, honoris causa, both by the University of Bohol and the University of Misamis (1987); Doctor of Public Administration, honoris causa, by the Polytechnic University of the Philippines (1991); and Doctor of Technology Education, honoris causa, by the Rizal Technological Colleges (1995). He was also a recipient of the "Dr. M.V. Delos Santos Memorial Medallion of Honor" by the University of Manila in 1996.

Gonzales sponsored the General Appropriations Bill from 1988 to 1992, 1994 and 1998.

As a Senator of the Republic, some of the numerous laws he principally authored/sponsored include Republic Act (R.A.) No. 6735, a law providing for a system of initiative and referendum; R.A. 6826, a law authorizing the President of the Philippines to exercise powers necessary and proper during a national emergency; R.A. 6981, a law providing for a "Witness Protection, Security and Benefits Program;" R.A. 7056, a law providing for synchronized and simultaneous national and local elections beginning 1995; R.A. 7309, a law providing for a victim compensation program to indemnify victims of violent crimes through a Board of Claims; R.A. 7323, a law institutionalizing the "Special Program for Employment of Students" (SPES) during summer and Christmas vacations; R.A. 7655, a law increasing the minimum wage of househelpers; R.A. 7876, an act establishing a senior citizens center in all cities and municipalities of the Philippines; R.A. 7904, a law requiring Comelec to furnish every registered voter with an official sample ballot, voter's information sheet and list of candidates; R.A. 8191, a law prescribing measures for the prevention and control of diabetes mellitus and providing for the creation of a National Commission on Diabetes; R.A. 8247, a law extending up to June 30, 1997, the deadline for the filing of applications for legal residence of illegal aliens; R.A. 8249, a law expanding the jurisdiction of the Sandiganbayan; and R.A. 8291, the Revised GSIS Act of 1997.

Third term (1998)
He again served as Senate President from January 26, 1998, to June 30, 1998.

Having been elected Senate president for the third time, he holds the distinction of presiding Congress twice in the canvassing of votes for president and vice president in 1992 (election of Fidel V. Ramos), and in 1998 (election of Joseph Estrada).

Post-Senate Presidency
After Gonzales' third and last term as Senate President, and his term as a senator, his public service ended on June 30, 1998. Gonzales then entered the corporate world by becoming the President and Publisher of the Manila Bulletin, one of the country's leading newspaper and was elected as member of its governing Board of Directors.

Death 
Gonzales died of heart failure on September 16, 2001, at the Makati Medical Center , at the age of 78. His body lies in their family estate in Mandaluyong.

Personal life 
Gonzales was married to Candida Medina for more than fifty years and was the father of four children: Myrna, Aida, Rhodora and Neptali II. His family remains a major pillar of life.

In recognition of his strong adherence to family values, he was presented with the "1994 ASEAN Father for Public Service Award" and the "1996 Ama ng Bayan Award" by the Golden Mother & Father Foundation and the "1996 Special Ideal Parents Award" from the Ideal Community Foundation of the Philippines and the Golden Mother & Father Foundation, and the "1996 Golden Parents Special Award" from the Golden Mother & Father Foundation.

He authored books on constitutional Law, Political Law, Administrative Law and Public Corporations.

Awards and honours
 1994 ASEAN Father for Public Service Award
 1996 Ama ng Bayan Award by the Golden Mother & Father Foundation
 1996 Special Ideal Parents Award from the GMFF and the Ideal Community Foundation of the Philippines
 1996 Golden Parents Special Award from the GMFF
 1996 - "Dr. M.V. Delos Santos Memorial Medallion of Honor" by the University of Manila

Notes

References

1923 births
2001 deaths
Academic staff of Far Eastern University
20th-century Filipino lawyers
Filipino writers
People from Mandaluyong
Liberal Party (Philippines) politicians
Presidents of the Senate of the Philippines
Minority leaders of the Senate of the Philippines
Senators of the 10th Congress of the Philippines
Senators of the 9th Congress of the Philippines
Senators of the 8th Congress of the Philippines
Members of the House of Representatives of the Philippines from Rizal
Members of the Rizal Provincial Board
Members of the House of Representatives of the Philippines from Metro Manila
Laban ng Demokratikong Pilipino politicians
Secretaries of Justice of the Philippines
Corazon Aquino administration cabinet members
Philippine Law School alumni
Manila Bulletin people
Filipino newspaper publishers (people)
Members of the Batasang Pambansa